Ramala is a village situated on the Delhi Saharanpur highway (National Highway 57) in Baghpat District of Uttar Pradesh in India.

Some Notable person--

1.Dhrampal Singh (chairman) 
(Kamarka patti) 
2.Sahendra Singh ex-mla

3.Chaudhary Zile Singh(Head of Chauhan khap)

4.Rajbeer Ramala(a famous gangster)
 
5.Dr.Rohan Singh Chauhan (MBBS 2018 llrm medical college meerut.)
(From Jeevan-buddhu Patti) 
 
6.Ch.Vivek Kumar (zila panchayat)
(Gal wali patti) 
 
7.Mauji khan, Retd. A.C.P., Delhi Police 

8. Nafe Singh Chauhan, Inspector (S.H.O.), Delhi Police 

9.Azad Singh (thekedar)
(Jeevan-buddhu patti) 

10. Birendra Singh Chauhan, Inspector (S.H.O.), Delhi Police

History-  Ramala village was under the kingdom of Royal Jat Maharaja Surajmal Singh of bharatpur during Mughals time and later under the Baba Sahamal Singh Tomar leadership.Ramala village have gotra of Lakda Chauhan (means- warrior of Chauhan). They were supporter of Chauhan confiredecy.

V

Village is divided into Pattis(local area) --
1.Danna Patti(biggest)
2.Jeevan-Buddhu Patti
3.Kamarka Patti
4.Bagdi Patti
5.Gaal wali Patti
6.Nanhiya Patti
7.Harijan area

References

Villages in Bagpat district